Lars Erik Bjørnsen (born 20 July 1982) is a Norwegian handball player. He has played 75 matches for the Norway men's national handball team between 2003 and 2011.  He participated at the 2009 World Men's Handball Championship.

References

1982 births
Living people
Norwegian male handball players
Expatriate handball players
Norwegian expatriates in Denmark